Augusto Chamorro (born 12 March 1963) is a Paraguayan footballer. He played in twelve matches for the Paraguay national football team from 1988 to 1989. He was also part of Paraguay's squad for the 1989 Copa América tournament.

References

External links
 

1963 births
Living people
Paraguayan footballers
Paraguay international footballers
Place of birth missing (living people)
Association football midfielders